Mallanagouda Basanagouda Patil (born 7 October 1964) is an Indian politician, who served as the Home Minister of Karnataka. He was earlier the Minister for Water Resources in Siddaramaiah cabinet. He is a former member of the Lok Sabha and is being elected for the fifth time as a Member of the Karnataka Legislative Assembly. He is the President of BLDE Association. He belongs to the dominant Lingayat Community.

Early life and education
He is the elder son of Shri B.M.Patil, a politician and an educationist.
M.B. Patil graduated with a Bachelor of Engineering, Civil Engineering at the BLDEA's Vachana Pitamaha P G Halakatti College of Engineering, Vijayapur.

Career

Social work
M.B. Patil has been involved in various social works including the distribution of school bags & books to the needy students, helping government schools in establishing smart classrooms, organizing plantation drives across Vijayapura district etc., through M B Patil foundation.

Political career
Patil started his political career in 1991. He was allotted the Irrigation Ministry in Siddaramaiah’s cabinet in 2013. His work as the Irrigation Minister of Karnataka gave a new lease of life to various stalled irrigation projects across Karnataka.

He was allotted Home Ministry in December 2018 in H D Kumaraswamy’s cabinet. Having been seen as a clean-handed politician & hailing from the dominant Lingayat community, he is considered to be one of the chief contenders for the post of Chief Minister of Karnataka in future.

References

External links
 M. B. Patil at Myneta
 https://nocorruption.in/politician/m-b-patil/
 http://myneta.info/karnataka2013/candidate.php?candidate_id=7

State cabinet ministers of Karnataka
1964 births
Living people
Indian National Congress politicians from Karnataka
Lok Sabha members from Karnataka
Karnataka MLAs 2008–2013
Karnataka MLAs 2013–2018
Karnataka MLAs 2018–2023
People from Bijapur district, Karnataka
Lingayatism
India MPs 1998–1999